Pomacentrus moluccensis, the lemon damselfish, is a species of bony fish in the family Pomacentridae, from the Western Pacific Ocean. It occasionally makes its way into the aquarium trade.

Description
The head is slightly longer than it is high, with a large eye and oblique mouth. The teeth are in two series and have rounded tips. The dorsal fin has 13 spines and 13 to 14 soft rays. The anal fin has 2 spines and 14 soft rays; the first anal spine is half the size of the second. The first ray of the pelvic fins is much elongated, and is longer than the head. The pectoral fins are rather shorter, and the caudal fin is shallowly forked with rounded lobes. The colour of this fish is a uniform yellow, and there is a small orange spot at the base of the pectoral fin (except for fish in the Philippines).

Distribution and habitat
Pomacentrus moluccensis is native to the tropical western Pacific Ocean.

Ecology

Pomacentrus moluccensis lives in and around coral reefs and is found in small groups. The diet consists mostly of algae, but planktonic invertebrates are also eaten. This fish forms pairs during the breeding season, the female laying her eggs on the substrate and the male guarding them and fanning them to keep them well-aerated. This fish is preyed on by such predatory fish as Cephalopholis boenak and Pseudochromis fuscus, and is better able to evade them and survive in high shelter environments such as provided by Pocillopora damicornis than low shelter ones provided by Acropora nobilis.

Pomacentrus moluccensis is a coral-associated species that has been shown to decline dramatically following coral bleaching.

In aquarium
If the environment is crowded, it may continue to pursue the peaceful fishes. When faced to more aggressive fish and it is the only one Pomacentrus moluccensis in the tank, it usually turns around and swims away immediately.

References

External links
 
 Lemon Damsel @ Fishes of Australia

moluccensis
Marine fish of Northern Australia
Fish described in 1853